Marius Steinhauser (born 6 February 1993) is a German handball player for TSV Hannover-Burgdorf.

Honours
German Championship
: 2016, 2017, 2018, 2019
: 2014, 2015
: 2013
German Super Cup
: 2015
EHF Cup
:2013

References

1993 births
Living people
German male handball players